Ruonala is a suburb in southern Finland at Kotka. Ruonala is also a family-name in Finland, found mainly near the cities of Kotka and Oulu.

References

Villages in Finland
Kotka